Pablo (Paul) Cruz Moreno (April 28, 1931 – September 1, 2017) was State Representative for the 77th District of El Paso, Texas, USA. He was born in Alamogordo, New Mexico but raised in El Paso's El Segundo Barrio, and after high school he enlisted in the U.S. Marine Corps serving in the Korean War. He received his BBA from the University of Texas at El Paso, and attended but did not complete his JD from the University of Texas at Austin.

Moreno was first elected to the Texas House in 1967 and served for 40 years, becoming the "conscience" of the body. He was the longest-serving Hispanic elected official in the United States, and presided as the Dean of the Texas House. Moreno co-founded the Mexican American Legislative Caucus of the Texas House of Representatives, a co-founder of El Paso Legal Assistance, and a founding member of the Tejano Democrats.

He was defeated by Marisa Marquez in the 2008 Democratic primary for the 77th district.

In 2011, the Mexican American Legal Defense and Educational Fund (MALDEF) honored Moreno with the organization's Lifetime Achievement Award.

Paul C Moreno Elementary School was named in his honor.

References 

1931 births
2017 deaths
People from El Paso, Texas
Military personnel from Texas
Democratic Party members of the Texas House of Representatives
Hispanic and Latino American state legislators in Texas
University of Texas at El Paso alumni
University of Texas at Austin
American politicians of Mexican descent